Vikram A. Sarabhai Community Science Centre (VASCSC) or simply known as CSC, was established in the 1960s by the eminent space scientist, Vikram Sarabhai in Ahmedabad, Gujarat, India. The centre works towards popularising science and mathematics education among students, teachers and the public. Its mandate is to stimulate interest, encourage and expose the principles of science and scientific method and also to improve and find innovative methods of science education. It is located opposite Gujarat University. VASCSC is open to all members of the community.

Vision

The centre's vision is to take students, from both school and College, out of the rigid framework of textbooks and encourage them to think, explore and create with the combination of formal and non-formal techniques to make the process of learning enjoyable and at the same time sustained and long lasting.

VASCSC has been networking and working with several eminent institutions and organizations in India and abroad.

Associated Scientists
C. V. Raman
P. C. Vaidya
Pisharoth Rama Pisharoty
M. S. Swaminathan
K. R. Ramanathan
A. P. J. Abdul Kalam
Yash Pal
M. G. K. Menon
A. R. Rao

References

External links

 Official Website

Organisations based in Ahmedabad
Science and technology in Gujarat